Proceed with Caution is a 1937 detective novel by John Rhode, the pen name of the British writer Cecil Street. It is the twenty seventh in his long-running series of novels featuring Lancelot Priestley, a Golden Age armchair detective. It was published in the United States the same year by Dodd Mead under the alternative title Body Unidentified.

E.R. Punshon writing in The Guardian felt " If only Mr. Rhode were a little more careful with his characterisation, if only his literary style were a little less pedestrian, he would take an even higher place than that his persistent—and consistent—ingenuity has won for him."

Synopsis
Superintendent Hanslet Inspector Waghorn of Scotland Yard investigate respectively a diamond robbery and a suspicious death. A consignment of valuable jewels have gone missing while being transported from Hatton Garden. Meanwhile a corpse is found in a tar burner in a Kent village, completely unrecognisable. It takes the genius of Priestley to demonstrate how these two events are linked.

References

Bibliography
 Evans, Curtis. Masters of the "Humdrum" Mystery: Cecil John Charles Street, Freeman Wills Crofts, Alfred Walter Stewart and the British Detective Novel, 1920-1961. McFarland, 2014.
 Magill, Frank Northen . Critical Survey of Mystery and Detective Fiction: Authors, Volume 3. Salem Press, 1988.
 Reilly, John M. Twentieth Century Crime & Mystery Writers. Springer, 2015.

1937 British novels
Novels by Cecil Street
British crime novels
British mystery novels
British detective novels
Collins Crime Club books
Novels set in London
Novels set in Kent